The Nashville Kats were an Arena Football League team, located in Nashville, Tennessee. They were last coached by Pat Sperduto, who coached the team's original incarnation to two ArenaBowl appearances prior to the original franchise's move to Atlanta in 2002 (then becoming the Georgia Force).  Sperduto also coached the second incarnation of the Nashville Kats following their return to the Arena Football League as an expansion team in 2005.

History

Original Nashville Kats (1997–2001)

The team began as the Nashville Kats in 1997. The franchise was that of charter Arena team the Denver Dynamite, which had not played since 1991. The original Kats played in the then-named Nashville Arena (AKA "The Alley") in downtown Nashville. The team was named for the 1967 hit "Nashville Cats" by The Lovin' Spoonful. The team's logo featured an anthropomorphic tabby wearing a 1950s-style leather jacket, holding the neck of a guitar in one paw and juggling a football with the other.

The Kats were initially coached by Eddie Khayat in 1997 and 1998, with the assistance of future Washington Football Team coach Jay Gruden as offensive co-ordinator in his first-ever coaching position. Gruden then returned to active play with the Orlando Predators and assistant to his brother Jon, then head coach of the NFL Tampa Bay Buccaneers, which played in the AFL off-season.  Khayat was succeeded as Kats' head coach by Pat Sperduto for the balance of the team's time in Nashville (including the second incarnation of the team). The Kats were the league's Organization of the Year for their inaugural year of 1997, and were in the playoffs for every season of their relatively brief existence. The team's success in the playoffs led to consecutive appearances in the ArenaBowl (XIV and XV) each of the original team's final two seasons, although they were unable to win the AFL's championship in either appearance.

After being unable to reach favorable agreements with arena management which was controlled by the venue's primary tenant, the Nashville Predators of the National Hockey League, majority owner Mark Bloom sold the franchise in December 2001 to Virgil Williams, an Atlanta businessman, for nearly $10 million. The team's departure from the Nashville market was not related to lack of success neither on the field, nor at the box office, where they were a superior draw to several ongoing Arena football teams, but rather their inability to negotiate a favorable lease with the Predators. Following the move to Atlanta, this team would be rechristened the Georgia Force.

The birth of the expansion Nashville Kats (2001–2005)

Shortly after the original team's departure from Nashville, Bud Adams, the owner of the Tennessee Titans of the National Football League, purchased the rights to an expansion franchise in Nashville (along with the Kats identity). Initially, Adams was unable to negotiate a lease with the Nashville Predators to return the team to then-Gaylord Entertainment Center (now called Bridgestone Arena and formerly Nashville Arena) on terms he deemed to be adequately favorable. Because Nashville Municipal Auditorium and Vanderbilt's Memorial Gym, the only other sizable indoor venues in Nashville, are unsuitable for arena football (Municipal Auditorium's floor was too small to contain the field of play as its ice hockey rink had always been of less-than-regulation size and Vanderbilt had a "dry" no-alcohol policy for on-campus athletic events), Adams explored the idea of building his own mid-size arena (roughly 10,000 seats) to host the Kats and compete with the Gaylord Entertainment Center for concerts and smaller sporting events. Ultimately, the Predators agreed to a deal with Adams during the summer of 2004. Following the new agreement, Adams announced that the expansion Kats would begin play for the 2005 season and would return to the arena the original team called home.

While the majority of the new team was owned by Adams, country music singer Tim McGraw was brought in as a minority investor. McGraw, his wife Faith Hill, and their children were often seen on the first row of sideline seats along the south endzone.  As a tie-in with McGraw, the PA system played his hit "I Like It, I Love It" following a Kats touchdown.

The new Kats take the field (2005–2007)
The second incarnation of the Nashville Kats began play in 2005 at the then-Gaylord Entertainment Center, the home of the original Kats team. When the Kats were revived, they reclaimed the history of the original Kats from the Georgia Force. This was an arrangement similar to the one made in the NFL with the Cleveland Browns and in the CFL with the Montreal Alouettes. The revived logo was almost identical to the original logo. The noteworthy exceptions were the ball (which was drawn as the lighter colored, brown-with-blue-stripe ball used in the AFL at that time) and the color scheme of the logo, which was slightly modified to mirror the team colors of the Tennessee Titans. New team uniforms also adopted the Tennessee Titans color scheme, going from the dark blue/silver/white combination of the original team to a new scheme including "Titans" light blue/red/white. The new team also introduced a new in-arena mascot named Kool Kat, a cat clad in a jersey and shorts that often performed daredevil stunts during breaks in the game. Sperduto also returned as head coach.

The new Kats' first season started horrendously.  After an opening victory on the road, it took until week 8 for the franchise to record another victory. But after that, the Kats won their next five games, and finished the season with a 6–9–1 record. The 41–41 tie at the Dallas Desperados on April 8 was only the second in AFL history, and prompted the League to change its overtime rules to eliminate ties before the start of the 2006 season.

Nashville finished the 2006 regular season with an 8–8 record; good enough to earn the team a playoff berth. The Kats lost in the opening round to the Chicago Rush.

The Kats finished the 2007 season with a 7–9 record and just missed the playoffs after a Utah Blaze win in the final week of the season. On October 10, 2007, after months of speculation, owner Bud Adams decided to shut down operations. While ticket sales had been good initially, the team struggled at the box office following its poor performance in the 2005 season (the first season of the revived team).

The team was not mentioned as a possible addition to the resurrected AFL in 2010, though fans have been clamoring for a return of the Kats in some form to the renamed Bridgestone Arena in Nashville.

In 2014, a new indoor football team began play at the Nashville Municipal Auditorium as the Nashville Venom in the Professional Indoor Football League, bringing the excitement of professional indoor football back to Music City. Although this team won the championship of its league in its initial season as a member, it vanished (along with the league as a whole) after the 2015 season.  there have been no further attempts to resurrect indoor football in the Nashville market.

Head coaches

Notable players

Arena Football Hall of Famers

Individual awards

All-Arena players
The following Kats players were named to All-Arena Teams:
 FB Dan Alexander (1)
 FB/LB Rupert Grant (1)
 WR/DB Darryl Hammond (1), Jarrick Hillery (1)
 WR/LB Cory Fleming (2)
 OL/DL James Baron (5), Joe Minucci (1)
 DB Ahmad Hawkins (1)
 DS Jamie Coleman (1), Corey Johnson (1), Kahlil Carter (1)

All-Ironman players
The following Force players were named to All-Ironman Teams:
 WR/DB Jarrick Hillery (1)
 WR/LB Cory Fleming (1), Darryl Hammond (2)
 OL/DL James Barron (2)

All-Rookie players
The following Kats players were named to All-Rookie Teams:
 FB/LB Travis Reece, Dan Alexander, Frank Carter
 WR/DB Tyronne Jones, Corey Johnson, Jarrick Hillery
 WR Kenny Higgins
 OL/DL Aaron Hamilton, Aaron McConnell, Joe Minucci

Season-by-season

References

External links
 Nashville Kats at ArenaFan.com
 Nashville Kats (1997–2001) at ArenaFan.com

 
American football teams in Tennessee
1997 establishments in Tennessee
American football teams established in 1997
Sports in Nashville, Tennessee
2007 disestablishments in Tennessee
American football teams disestablished in 2007